Thet Mon Aye is a Burmese politician who currently serves as a Magway Region Hluttaw member of parliament for Seikphyu Township No. 1Constituency. She is a member of the National League for Democracy.

In 2015 Myanmar general election and
2020 Myanmar general election, she was elected as a Magway Region Hluttaw MP, and elected representative from Seikphyu Township No. 1 parliamentary constituency.

References

National League for Democracy politicians
Living people
People from Magway Division
1979 births